Stella Alexander (née Tucker, 1912 – 1998) was a British writer and scholar. Her letters and unpublished memoir are held by the British Library and cover a wide range of subject areas including the Quaker movement, Yugoslav history and the Japanese occupation of Shanghai in World War II.

Biography 

Alexander was born in Shanghai, China in 1912, the daughter of an American bullion broker. She went to university in Oxford, England where she met and then married a British diplomat, John Alexander. The couple returned to Shanghai following their marriage.

At the time of their return to China, Shanghai was occupied by Japan. In 1941 Japan attacked Pearl Harbor and foreign diplomats living in China were interned, the Alexanders in the Cathay Hotel in Shanghai. In 1942 they returned to the US following a citizen exchange between Japan and the US.

Alexander and her husband divorced in 1950 and she began working for the United Nations Association, becoming increasingly involved with the Quakers.  In 1957 she represented the Quakers' London Yearly Meeting at the UN General Assembly.

Alexander’s interest in Yugoslavia began in the late fifties and between 1961 to the 1970s she travelled there almost annually. She travelled the country, often alone, learned Serbo-Croatian and wrote extensively on what she saw.  Her writings are rare eye-witness accounts on life in Eastern Europe during the Cold War.

Publications 

 Alexander, S. (1958). Quaker testimony against slavery and racial discrimination: an anthology. London: Friends' Home Service Committee.
 Alexander, S. (1979). Church and state in Yugoslavia since 1945. Cambridge: Cambridge University Press.
 Alexander, S. (1987). The triple myth: A life of Archbishop Alojzije Stepinac. New York: Columbia University Press.

References 

1912 births
1998 deaths
British letter writers
British non-fiction writers